Hans Werner Richter (12 November 1908 – 23 March 1993) was a German writer.

Born in Neu Sallenthin, Usedom, Richter is little known for his own works but found worldwide celebrity and acknowledgment as initiator, moving spirit and "grey eminence" of the Group 47, the most important literary association of the German Federal Republic of the post-war period. Richter died in Munich, aged 84.

Works
 Deine Söhne Europa - Gedichte deutscher Kriegsgefangener (collected poems, 1947)
 Die Geschlagenen (novel, 1949)
 Sie fielen aus Gottes Hand (novel, 1951)
 Spuren im Sand (novel, 1953)
 Du sollst nicht töten (novel, 1955)
 Linus Fleck oder Der Verlust der Würde (1959)
 Bestandsaufnahme – Eine deutsche Bilanz (1962)
 Bismarck (1964)
 Karl Marx in Samarkand (1966)
 Blinder Alarm (story, 1970)
 Briefe an einen jungen Sozialisten (autobiography, 1974)
 Die Flucht nach Abanon (story, 1980)
 Die Stunde der falschen Triumphe (novel, 1981)
 Ein Julitag (novel, 1982)
  (How the Group 47 started)

1908 births
1993 deaths
People from Vorpommern-Greifswald
People from the Province of Pomerania
Communist Party of Germany politicians
Writers from Mecklenburg-Western Pomerania
German military personnel of World War II
Commanders Crosses of the Order of Merit of the Federal Republic of Germany
20th-century German novelists
German male novelists
20th-century German male writers